Dasychira colini is a species of moth of the subfamily Lymantriinae first described by Paul Mabille in 1893. It is known from Madagascar and Senegal.

The female has a wingspan of 52 mm. The wings are of pure and uniform white colour. Body is snow white, back of rings in palish yellow. Mabille named this species after the director of the Royal Observatory of Madagascar,  R. P. E. Colin.

References

Lymantriinae
Moths of Madagascar
Insects of West Africa
Moths of Africa